Glyphipterix scleriae is a species of sedge moth in the genus Glyphipterix. It was described by Yutaka Arita in 1987. It is found in Japan.

References

Moths described in 1987
Glyphipterigidae
Moths of Japan